Michael Richard Taylor (born August 29, 1972) is an American basketball coach. He currently serves as head coach for the Winnipeg Sea Bears of the Canadian Elite Basketball League (CEBL). Previously, he was head coach of the Poland national team, which he led to the Round of 16 at the 2015 EuroBasket and the quarter-finals of the 2019 FIBA World Cup.

Before he coached Poland, he led several professional teams in the United States and Germany.

Coaching career

Hamburg Towers
On 23 May 2018, Taylor signed a two-year contract with Hamburg Towers of the German second tier ProA.

He was sitting there without notice and without being noticed until a journalist walking up the steps recognized the spectator who knew a bit more about basketball than all the others there.

In the stand for the first game of day three at the IWBF Wheelchair Basketball World Championships was Mike Taylor, the new head coach of the Hamburg Towers, a second tier ProA team in the Basketball Bundesliga with greater aspirations. He was brought in this season to bring the Towers, whose home court is this same arena, to the top level. The two teams he was watching push up and down the court below – the United States and Poland national wheelchair basketball teams - are already among the world's best.

An American from western Pennsylvania where his dad was a coach, Taylor was nonetheless split on his loyalties. For the last five years, he has been working as head coach for the Poland national team, coaching NBA and top European league players.

Friendly and immediately affable, the coach related that he had met members of the Polish wheelchair basketball staff and team when the two squads shared a training facility.

Mike Taylor will be the new head coach of the Hamburg Towers from the 2018/19 season. The Wilhelmsburg and 45-year-old agreed on a two-year contract. Taylor currently oversees the Polish national team. Benka Barloschky, who stepped in as an interim coach last season, will assist him.

“Mike is definitely our preferred candidate and was at the top of the list when we started looking for a coach. With this very experienced and highly recognized coach in Europe as well as in the US, we made a big impression. His profile is impressive: Mike has demonstrated that he can lead teams to promotion, has already coached in the Bundesliga, gained experience in dealing with the best of the best in the D-League, and has done an excellent job in Eastern Europe, where some of our players come from Reputation worked out. This is a portfolio that not many trainers can show. Since he has an extremely positive, winning way of doing this, he fits 100 percent with the Hamburg Towers. An absolute plus is his great interest in promoting young people, which he has repeatedly shown from the very first interview. He helped players like Per Günther and Robin Benzing to start their careers and ultimately helped them to the highest levels. We would like to follow a similar path here in Hamburg, ”says Towers managing director and sports director Marvin Willoughby.

 In his first season, he won the championship with the club and led Hamburg to its first promotion to the Basketball Bundesliga (BBL).

References

External links

Eurobasket.com Profile
Official website

1972 births
Living people
American expatriate basketball people in Germany
American expatriate basketball people in Poland
American expatriate basketball people in the United Kingdom
American men's basketball coaches
American men's basketball players
Basketball coaches from Pennsylvania
Basketball players from Pennsylvania
IUP Crimson Hawks men's basketball coaches
IUP Crimson Hawks men's basketball players
Maine Red Claws coaches
Pittsburg State Gorillas men's basketball coaches
Ratiopharm Ulm coaches
Rio Grande Valley Vipers coaches
Sportspeople from Williamsport, Pennsylvania
United States Basketball League coaches
Hamburg Towers coaches